Jesus Muñoz Crespo (11 September 1899 – 11 September 1979) was a Portuguese footballer who played as a forward.

Career
Crespo arrived at Benfica in 1917, at the age of 18. He made his official debut in the first game of the 1917–18 edition of the Campeonato de Lisboa, on 16 December 1917.

Capable of playing either as inside forward or centre-forward, in a 2-3-5 formation, he was mainly used as inside forward and partnered with José Simões, while both supported players like Alberto Augusto, Tavares, or Mário Carvalho. On 16 December 1923, he received his only cap, in a 0-3 loss against Spain played on Avenida de la Reina Victoria, Sevilla.

Over the course of 12 seasons, he played more than 100 matches, a club record at that time, retiring at age 30, with his last match on 24 February 1929.

Honours
Benfica
Campeonato de Lisboa (2)
Taça de Honra (2)

References
General
 

Specific

External links
 
 
 

1899 births
1979 deaths
Portuguese footballers
Association football forwards
S.L. Benfica footballers
Portugal international footballers
Place of birth missing